The 1600 siege of Tanabe was one of a number of battles which took place in parallel to the more influential series of battles known as the Sekigahara Campaign which led to the unification of Japan under Tokugawa Ieyasu.

History 
The command of Tanabe Castle was held by Hosokawa Tadaoki. However, Tadaoki accompanied Ieyasu to Sekigahara, as part of the Tokugawa vanguard. Tadaoki's father Hosokawa Fujitaka and his mother Numata Jakō defended the castle walls against Ikoma Chikamasa's western forces under Onoki Shigekatsu. It is believed that, due to the respect they held for Hosokawa, the besieging army was somewhat slower and less effective than they might have been otherwise, and in the end the battle served to tie up these Western Army (anti-Tokugawa) contingents, preventing them from participating in the battle at Sekigahara.

References

Turnbull, Stephen (1998). 'The Samurai Sourcebook'. London: Cassell & Co. p252.
Bryant, Anthony J (1995). 'Sekigahara 1600 - The final struggle for power', London: Osprey Publishing.

1600 in Japan
Tanabe
Conflicts in 1600